Skurla is a surname. Notable people with the surname include:

George M. Skurla (1921–2001), American aerospace engineer
William C. Skurla (born 1956), American Ruthenian Eastern Catholic bishop, current leader of Ruthenian Church
Laurus Škurla (1928–2008), American Russian Orthodox bishop, leader of Russian Foreign Church